Steven Andrew Marsh (born 27 January 1961), is a former English cricketer. He was a right-handed batsman and wicket-keeper, and played for Kent County Cricket Club for his entire career, between 1982 and 1999. He was appointed club captain in 1997 and continued in that role until the end of the 1998 season. He was capped by Kent in 1986.

External links

1961 births
English cricketers
Living people
Kent cricketers
Kent cricket captains
People from Westminster
Wicket-keepers